Milko Campus (born 2 April 1969) is a retired Italian long jumper.

He won one medal at the International athletics competitions.

Biography
He finished eleventh at the 1994 European Championships. He also competed at the 1990 European Championships without reaching the final. He became Italian champion in 1988, 1989, 1994 and 1995.

His personal best jump was 8.13 metres, achieved in June 1994 in Formia, he has 18 caps in national team from 1988 to 2000.

National titles
Milko Campus has won 6 times the individual national championship.
4 wins in long jump (1988, 1989, 1994, 1995)
2 wins in long jump indoor (1996, 2005)

See also
 Italian all-time lists - Long jump

References

External links
 

1969 births
Living people
Italian male long jumpers